Honey Creek is a stream in Daviess County in the U.S. state of Missouri. It is a tributary of the Grand River.

Honey Creek most likely was named for the honeybees near its course.

See also
List of rivers of Missouri

References

Rivers of Daviess County, Missouri
Rivers of Missouri